Sir Thomas Tyrrell (23 June 1594 – 8 March 1672) was an English judge and politician who sat in the House of Commons  in 1659 and 1660. He fought on the Parliamentarian side in the English Civil War.

Tyrrill was the son of Sir Edward Tyrrell of Thornton Hall, Buckinghamshire and his second wife Margaret Aston, daughter of Thomas Aston of Aston Cheshire.  He was admitted to the Inner Temple in 1612 and was called to the Bar on 13 November 1621. In 1642, he was Deputy Lieutenant of Buckinghamshire.  In the Civil War he was a captain, and later colonel of horse in the Parliamentarian Army under Bedford and Essex. He fought at the battle of Lostwithiel in 1644.

In 1659 Tyrrell was elected Member of Parliament for Aylesbury in the Third Protectorate Parliament. In the same year he was admitted as a Bencher and became joint Commissioner of the Great Seal, and Sergeant at Law. In 1660 he was elected MP for Buckinghamshire in the Convention Parliament. He was knighted on 16 July 1660, and appointed Justice of the Court of Common Pleas on 27 July 1660. He was on the commission for the trial of the regicides, but took no active part. In 1667, following the Great Fire of London  he was  one of the twenty two judges appointed to resolve property disputes arising from the rebuilding the city. Portraits of the judges were put up in the Guildhall by the city in gratitude for their services.

Tyrrell died aged 78 and was buried at Castlethorpe Church.

Tyrrell married a daughter of —Saunders of Buckinghamshire. Their son Peter became a baronet. Tyrrell married thirdly  Bridget Harington, daughter of Sir Edward Harington of Ridlington, Rutland.

References

1594 births
1672 deaths
Justices of the Common Pleas
Roundheads
English MPs 1659
English MPs 1660